Jane Rachel Brucker (born May 14, 1958) is an American actress best known for playing the part of Lisa Houseman, Baby's elder sister in the hit 1987 film Dirty Dancing.

Life and career
Brucker was born in Falls Church, Virginia. She studied theater at the North Carolina School of the Arts, and worked with the improv group, First Amendment, in New York. One of her classmates was Bruce Willis.

She was married to actor Brian O'Connor from 1986 to 1993. Their daughter, Sally O'Connor, was born in 1989. In November 2001 she wed photographer Raul Vega; they have a daughter, Rachel, born in 2003.

Brucker co-wrote the song "Hula Hana" that her character Lisa sings during the show rehearsal in Dirty Dancing.
She appeared in season 1 episode 14 of the television program Wiseguy.

Filmography

 1987: Dirty Dancing (Lisa Houseman)
 1988: Stealing Home
 1989: Doctor Doctor
 1989: Bloodhounds of Broadway

References
The E! True Hollywood Story: Dirty Dancing, first aired September 3, 2000

External links

Actresses from Virginia
American film actresses
Living people
People from Falls Church, Virginia
20th-century American actresses
21st-century American women
1958 births